The men's flyweight event was part of the boxing programme at the 1960 Summer Olympics.  The weight class was the lightest contested, and allowed boxers of up to 51 kilograms to compete. The competition was held from 25 August to 5 September 1960. 33 boxers from 33 nations competed.

Competition format

The competition was a straight single-elimination tournament, with no bronze medal match (two bronze medals were awarded, one to each semifinal loser). With 33 boxers competing, there was only one bout in the round of 64.

Results

Results of the flyweight boxing competition.

Top half

Bottom half

Finals

References

Flyweight